Peritrox nigromaculatus is a species of beetle in the family Cerambycidae. It was described by Per Olof Christopher Aurivillius in 1920. It is known from Paraguay and Brazil.

References

Onciderini
Beetles described in 1920